Raccordo autostradale 11 (RA 11) commonly known by the name of superstrada Ascoli-Mare, is a spur route managed by ANAS which connects Ascoli Piceno to the  Adriatic highway, as a variant to the old route of Strada statale 4 "Via Salaria" that previously carried out that function.

References 

RA11
Transport in le Marche
Transport in Abruzzo